Joseph Allen Ayrault (born October 8, 1971) is a former professional baseball player. He appeared in seven games in Major League Baseball for the Atlanta Braves as a catcher. He currently serves as the manager of the Wisconsin Timber Rattlers in the High-A Midwest League.

Ayrault is best known for being included on the postseason roster of the 1996 Braves by manager Bobby Cox despite having had just 5 major league at bats. He never appeared in a major league game before or after 1996.

In 2007, Ayrault became the manager of the Sarasota Reds of the Florida State League, spending three seasons there. In 2010, he joined the Rookie League Helena Brewers as manager. In 2012, Ayrault was promoted to the Brevard County Manatees.  At the time the Manatees were the Class A-Advanced (High-A) Minor League Baseball affiliate of the Milwaukee Brewers. In 2017 Ayrault began managing the Carolina Mudcats after the Brewers changed affiliations at the high-A level. The team moved to low-A in 2021.  In 2022 Ayrault was named the Manager of the Timber Rattlers, the Brewers high-A affiliate.

On July 10, 2021 Ayrault secured his 800th career managerial victory at the minor league level.

References

Sources

Major League Baseball catchers
Atlanta Braves players
Gulf Coast Braves players
Pulaski Braves players
Macon Braves players
Durham Bulls players
Greenville Braves players
Richmond Braves players
Minor league baseball managers
Baseball players from Michigan
1971 births
Living people
Sarasota High School alumni
Sportspeople from Sarasota, Florida